Handan İpekçi (born 1956 in Ankara, Turkey) is a Turkish screenwriter and film director.

Education
Handan İpekçi studied Radio and Television Studies at Gazi University, Faculty of Communication in Ankara. The controversial feature Hejar which she wrote, produced and directed was Turkey's official submission for the 74th Academy Award for Best Foreign Language Film.

Filmography

Awards
İpekçi received local and international awards. Dad is in the Army brought her most promising director and screenwriter awards among others at Turkish film festivals, Hejar won nine awards including Golden Orange for Best Film and Best Screenplay at Antalya Film Festival and Silver Pyramid at Cairo Film Festival.

References

External links

Turkish film directors
Turkish male screenwriters
People from Ankara
1956 births
Living people